"Alex" Liu Lic Ka (born March 18, 1971, in Hong Kong) is an auto racing driver from Macau.

Racing career
He has competed mainly in touring car racing in Asia, regularly competing in the support races at the Macau Grand Prix. He made his World Touring Car Championship debut at the 2009 FIA WTCC Race of Macau, driving for Liqui Moly Team Engstler alongside compatriots Henry Ho and Joe Rosa Merszei. He returned to the WTCC again in 2012, driving a BMW 320si for Liqui Moly Team Engstler at the Race of China.

Racing record

Complete World Touring Car Championship results
(key) (Races in bold indicate pole position) (Races in italics indicate fastest lap)

References

Living people
1971 births
Macau racing drivers
World Touring Car Championship drivers
TCR Asia Series drivers
Hong Kong emigrants to Macau

Asia Racing Team drivers
Asian Touring Car Championship drivers
Engstler Motorsport drivers